The Washington Secretary of State election, 2020, was held on November 3, 2020. Incumbent Republican Kim Wyman won reelection over Democratic nominee Gael Tarleton, the two having received the most votes in an August 2020 primary election. , this was the last time a Republican won a statewide election in Washington.

Wyman was endorsed by former Washington governor Daniel J. Evans, former United States senator Slade Gorton, Democratic Michigan Secretary of State Jocelyn Benson, three former Republican Washington Secretaries of State, former Democratic Oregon Secretary of State Phil Keisling, and two former Washington State Auditors; various county auditors, state legislators, local elected officials, tribal officials, and political organizations, and community leaders; and the newspapers The Seattle Times, The Everett Herald, The Columbian, The Walla Walla Union-Bulletin, The Olympian, The Tacoma News Tribune, The Tri-City Herald, The Yakima Herald, The Spokesman-Review, and Northwest Asian Weekly.

Tarleton was endorsed by Democratic presidential nominee Joe Biden, incumbent Washington governor Jay Inslee, former governor Gary Locke, United States senators Patty Murray and Maria Cantwell, Washington Attorney General Bob Ferguson; various United States Representatives, state legislators, local elected officials, political organizations, and community leaders; and The Stranger.

Primary election

General election

Predictions

Polling
Graphical summary

Results

By congressional district

Wyman won 7 of 10 congressional districts, including 4 that also went for Joe Biden, despite Biden endorsing Tarleton.

Notes

References

secretary of state
2020
2020 United States state secretary of state elections
November 2020 events in the United States